Mezirinae is a subfamily of flat bug. Distributed globally. More than 1120 described species in 124 genera.

Genera
 Ambohitanyela Heiss & Banar, 2013
 †Aphleboderrhis Stål, 1860
 †Brevisensoria Poinar, 2011 Dominican amber, Miocene
 Mezira Amyot & Serville, 1843
†Myanmezira Heiss and Poinar 2012 Burmese amber, Myanmar, Cenomanian
 Nannium Bergroth, 1898
 Neuroctenus Fieber, 1860
 Notapictinus Usinger & Matsuda, 1959

References

 Bugguide.net. Subfamily Mezirinae

Aradoidea